School for Suicide is a 1964 Danish drama film directed by Knud Leif Thomsen. It was entered into the 14th Berlin International Film Festival.

Cast
 Jørgen Ryg - Mand der ønsker at begå selvmord
 Axel Strøbye - Professor / Bilsælger
 Hans W. Petersen - Bedemanden S.S. Markussen
 Bodil Udsen - Sundhedsplejerske
 Tina Nørløv - Kvinde der reklamerer i tv
 Judy Gringer - Sekretær for professoren
 Helle Hertz - Frk. Hansen
 Lone Hertz - Kvinde der studerer sex-stillinger
 Harald Isenstein - Kunstner
 Minna Jørgensen - Mor
 Palle Huld - Far
 Kirsten Walther - Datter
 Preben Kaas - Søn
 Morten Grunwald - Søn
 Paul Hagen - Taler foran Folketinget
 Klaus Nielsen - Mand i Nyhavn

References

External links

1964 films
1960s Danish-language films
1964 drama films
Films directed by Knud Leif Thomsen
Danish drama films